John Stanley Pottinger (born February 13, 1940) is an American novelist and lawyer.  He previously worked as a banker in the 1980s and served as a political executive known for his appointments involving civil rights.

Early life and education 
J. Stanley Pottinger was born in 1940 in Dayton Ohio, to parents Elnora and John Pottinger.  He grew up and attended high school in Dayton.  Pottinger credits his father John with instilling in him an awareness of civil rights.  In 1962, Pottinger graduated from Harvard University. He continued his studies at Harvard and graduated with a JD from Harvard Law School in 1965.  Pottinger's interest in politics led him to volunteer in 1966 to aid the campaign of Robert H. Finch for lieutenant governor of California.  Finch asked him in 1968 to head the Civil Rights Division.

Career 
Pottinger held significant roles as a bureaucratic appointee in the Nixon, Ford and Carter Administrations. He held the position of the Director of the Office for Civil Rights at the Department of Health, Education and Welfare from 1970 to 1973 and later served as Assistant Attorney General for Civil Rights in the United States Department of Justice from 1973 to 1977. According to journalist Bob Woodward, Pottinger was the only person who discovered that the true identity of Watergate source Deep Throat was Mark Felt. Pottinger maintained the secret until 2005, when Felt publicly declared he was Deep Throat. 

Pottinger later engaged in a lucrative practice on Wall Street and wrote a best selling book, The Fourth Procedure, as well as three other novels. 

In 2013, Pottinger was a signatory to an amicus curiae brief submitted to the Supreme Court in support of same-sex marriage during the Hollingsworth v. Perry case.

Pottinger represented more than 20 survivors of Jeffrey Epstein's sexual abuse.

Personal life 
Pottinger began dating Gloria Anderson in high school; they married in 1965 and have three children together, including former U.S. Deputy National Security Advisor Matt Pottinger. Pottinger and Anderson divorced in 1975.  He later had a nine-year relationship with Gloria Steinem that ended in 1984. Other exes include Kathie Lee Gifford, Connie Chung, and publisher-turned-agent Joni Evans, according to a 1995 profile in The Washington Post.

References

External links
 
Edwards Pottinger Official Website
 

20th-century American businesspeople
20th-century American lawyers
20th-century American male writers
20th-century American novelists
20th-century American politicians
21st-century American lawyers
21st-century American male writers
21st-century American novelists
1940 births
American male novelists
Ford administration personnel
Harvard Law School alumni
Living people
New York (state) Republicans
Nixon administration personnel
Novelists from Ohio
Ohio Republicans
United States Assistant Attorneys General for the Civil Rights Division
Writers from Dayton, Ohio